Rede Gazeta, also known as TV Gazeta or only Gazeta (in English, (the) Gazette Network) is a Brazilian television network based in São Paulo.

History
TV Gazeta was founded in 1970 in São Paulo. It is part of Cásper Líbero Foundation. It was one of the first Brazilian TV stations to broadcast in color in 1970, together with RecordTV, Rede Bandeirantes, Rede Globo, Rede Tupi and TV Cultura.
In 1993 it merged with CNT (Central Nacional de Televisão, National Central Television), and its São Paulo local station became known CNT/Gazeta. In 2000, the partnership ended, and TV Gazeta turned into Rede Gazeta (Portuguese for Gazeta Network). Both networks are currently independent television networks.

Programs 
Shows

 Nossa Noite com Rinaldi Faria
 Festa do Mallandro (1998-2002)
 Programa Ligação (1997-2001)

Other programs

 5 Discos
 A Máquina (2012-2016)
 Amor Concreto
 Cozinha Amiga
 Edição Extra
 Festa Sertaneja
 Gazeta Esportiva
 Hoje Tem (2011-2016)
 Jornal da Gazeta
 Jornal da Gazeta Edição das 10
 LBF - Brazilian Women's Basketball League
 Mesa Redonda
 Mulheres
 O Mochileiro (2014-2015)
 Os Impedidos (2013)
 Ouça! (2015)
 Revista da Cidade
 Sempre Bela
 Todo Seu''''(2004-2019)
 Vem Comigo
 Você Bonita

External links
Official website

Television networks in Brazil
Mass media companies based in São Paulo
Portuguese-language television networks
Television channels and stations established in 1970